Eerik Idarand (born 21 July 1991) is an Estonian speed skater and former track cyclist.

He was born in Tallinn.

He started his sporting exercising in 2002, coached by his father Tiit Idarand. He is multiple-times Estonian champion in different skating disciplines. In 2006 he won Finnish Championships in short track speed skating. He has competed at European Track Championships.

In 2009 he was named as Best Junior Sportman of Kalev.

In 2010 Idarand won the National Sprint championship on the track.

References

External links
 

Living people
1991 births
Estonian male speed skaters
Estonian male cyclists
Sportspeople from Tallinn